Roland Freymond (born on 15 March 1953) was a Grand Prix motorcycle road racer from Switzerland. His best years were in 1981 and 1982 when he finished in third place in the 250cc world championship. Freymond won one Grand Prix race during his career, the 1982 250cc Swedish Grand Prix.

References 

1953 births
Swiss motorcycle racers
250cc World Championship riders
350cc World Championship riders
Living people